The Battle of Badon (/ˈbeɪdən/), also known as the Battle of Mons Badonicus ("Blockade/Siege of the Badonic Hill"; Bellum in monte Badonis, "Battle on Badon Hill"; Bellum Badonis, "Battle of Badon"; Old Welsh: Badon; Middle Welsh: Gweith Vadon, "Battle of Badon"; , "Battle of Badon Mount/Hill"), was a battle purportedly fought between Britons and Anglo-Saxons in Post-Roman Britain during the late 5th or early 6th century. It was credited as a major victory for the Britons, stopping the westward encroachment of the Anglo-Saxon kingdoms for a period.

The earliest known references to the battle, by the British cleric Gildas, date to the 6th century. It is chiefly known today for the supposed involvement of the man who would later be remembered as the legendary King Arthur; although it is not agreed that Arthur was a historical person, his name first appears in the 9th-century Historia Brittonum, where he is mentioned as having participated in the battle alongside the Brittonic kings as a war commander, though is not described as a king himself. Because of the limited number of sources, there is no certainty about the date, location, or details of the fighting.

Historical accounts

Gildas
The earliest mention of the Battle of Badon appears in Gildas' De Excidio et Conquestu Britanniae (On the Ruin and Conquest of Britain), written in the early to mid-6th century. In it, the Anglo-Saxons are said to have "dipped [their] red and savage tongue in the western ocean" before Ambrosius Aurelianus organized a British resistance with the survivors of the initial Saxon onslaught. Gildas describes the period that followed Ambrosius' initial success:

De Excidio Britanniae describes the battle as such an "unexpected recovery of the [island]" that it caused kings, nobles, priests, and commoners to "live orderly according to their several vocations." Afterwards, the long peace degenerated into civil wars and the iniquity of Maelgwn Gwynedd.

That Arthur had gone unmentioned by Gildas, ostensibly the source closest to his own time, was noticed at least as early as a 12th-century hagiography of Gildas which claims that Gildas had praised Arthur extensively but then excised him completely after Arthur killed the saint's brother, Hueil mab Caw. Modern writers have suggested the details of the battle may have been so well known that Gildas expected his audience to be familiar with them.

Bede
The battle is next mentioned in an 8th-century text of Bede's Ecclesiastical History of the English People (Historia Ecclesiastica Gentis Anglorum), which describes the "siege of Mount Badon, when they made no small slaughter of those invaders," as occurring 44 years after the first Anglo-Saxon settlement of Britain. Since Bede places that arrival just before, during or just after the joint reign in Rome of Marcian and Valentinian III in AD 449456, he must have considered Badon to have taken place between 493 and 500. Bede then puts off discussion of the battle  "But more of this hereafter"  only to seemingly never return to it.

Bede does later include an extended account of Saint Germanus of Auxerre's victory over the Saxons and Picts in a mountain valley (traditionally placed at Mold in Flintshire in northeast Wales), which he credits with curbing the threat of invasion for a generation. However, as the victory is described as having been accomplished bloodlessly, it was presumably a different occasion from Badon. Accepted at face value, Saint Germanus' involvement would also place the battle around AD 430, although Bede's chronology shows no knowledge of this.

Nennius and the Welsh Annals

The earliest surviving text specifically mentioning Arthur in connection with the battle is the early 9th-century Historia Brittonum (The History of the Britons), attributed to the Welsh monk Nennius, in which the soldier (Latin mīles) Arthur is identified as the leader of the victorious British force at Badon:

The Battle of Badon is next mentioned in the Annales Cambriae (Annals of Wales), assumed to have been written during the mid- to late-10th century. The entry states:

Geoffrey of Monmouth
Geoffrey of Monmouth's c. 1136 Historia Regum Britanniae (The History of the Kings of Britain) was massively popular and survives in many copies from soon after its composition. Going into (and fabricating) much greater detail, Geoffrey closely identifies Badon with Bath, including having Merlin foretell that Badon's baths would lose their hot water and turn poisonous. He also mixes in aspects of other accounts: the battle begins as a Saxon siege and then becomes a normal engagement once Arthur's men arrive; Arthur bears the image of the Virgin both on his shield and shoulder. Arthur charges and kills 470, ten more than the number of Britons ambushed by Hengist near Salisbury.

Elements of the Welsh legends are added: in addition to the shield Pridwen, Arthur gains his sword, Caliburnus (Excalibur), and his spear, Ron. Geoffrey also makes the defence of the city from the Saxon sneak attack a holy cause, having Dubricius offer absolution of all sins for those who fall in battle.

Scholarship
There is considerable scholarly debate as to the exact date and location of the battle, though most agree that it took place in southern England sometime around the turn of the sixth century.

Date
Dates proposed by scholars for the battle include 493, 501 and 516. Daniel McCarthy and Dáibhí Ó Cróinín have posited that Gildas' 44 years and one month is not a reference to the simple chronology but a position within the 84-year Easter cycle used for computus at the time by the Britons and the Irish church. The tables in question begin in January 438, which would place their revised date of the battle in February 482.

Andrew Breeze, in a 2020 book, argues that the Battle of Badon or "Braydon, Wiltshire" took place in 493, deducing that Gildas was writing De Excidio in 536, in the middle of the extreme weather events of 535–536, because he cited a "certain thick mist and black night" which "sits upon the whole island" of Britain, but not the subsequent famine in the year 537. Breeze concluded that Badon was fought "(...) in southern Britain, was fought in 493 and had nothing to do with Arthur."

Location
Though academics have never reached any consensus, Mount Badon’s location has traditionally been sited in the hills around Bath, most notably at Bathampton Down. Tim and Annette Burkitt have proposed Caer Badden (now Bath, Somerset), some 20 miles northeast of the Roman mines at Charterhouse, on the basis of the Welsh Annals as well as archaeological and toponymic evidence.

Susan Hirst, Geoffrey Ashe and Michael Wood argue for the site of Liddington Castle on the hill above Badbury (Old English: Baddan byrig) in Wiltshire. This site commands The Ridgeway, which connects the River Thames with the River Avon and River Severn beyond.

The similarly named Badbury Rings in Dorset have also been argued to be the location of the battle. David Cooper agrees that this is the most likely site and has provided the most comprehensive analysis of the battle available to date.

Andrew Breeze has argued that Badon must be etymologically Brittonic rather than English (thus eliminating Bath from consideration as its name is entirely Germanic), and that the toponym as given by Gildas (Badonici Montis) is a misprint of Bradonici Montis, based on known Celtic placenames in Wales and Cornwall. Breeze posits Ringsbury Camp near Braydon in Wiltshire as the site of the battle.

Possible Saxon commander
Some authors have speculated that Ælle of Sussex may have led the Saxon forces at this battle. Others reject the idea out of hand.

Second Badon
The A Text of the Annales Cambriae includes the entry: "The first celebration of Easter among the Saxons. The second battle of Badon. Morgan dies." The date for this action is given by Phillimore as AD 665, but the Saxons' first Easter is placed by the B Text in its entry 634 years after the birth of Christ and "the second Badon" is not mentioned.

Romance depiction
The 13th-century Vulgate Cycle, a French prose romance retelling of the Arthurian legend, replaced the Battle of Badon with the Battle of Clarence (spelling variants: Clarance, Clarans, Clarenche, Clarens). In the first round of fighting, a coalition of British kings is defeated by the Saxons (or the Saracens in some versions, including that by Thomas Malory). In the second phase, Arthur joins the battle and enemy forces are destroyed, driving invaders into the sea.

Local lore

Apart from the professional scholarship, various communities throughout Wales and England have their own traditions maintaining that their area was the site of the battle. These include (besides Badbury Rings and Bathampton Down), the mountain of Mynydd Baedan near Maesteg in South Wales, and Bowden Hill in Wiltshire.

Modern depictions
King Arthur leads the Knights of the Round Table into battle against the Saxons led by Hengist in the Prince Valiant comic strip series episodes 1430 (5 July 1964) and following. The battle is mentioned in the 1975 comedy film Monty Python and the Holy Grail as one of the many questionable feats of Sir Robin, who in the film's bardic narration is said to have "personally wet himself at the Battle of Badon Hill". The battle is featured prominently in 1997's Excalibur: A Novel of Arthur by Bernard Cornwell, in the book's second part, "Mynydd Baddon", in which the armies of Angle and Saxon kings Aelle and Cerdic, aided by Celtic traitors led by Lancelot, are defeated in an epic battle by an uneasy alliance of various British and Irish kingdoms. The author combines various medieval accounts of the battle, such as it beginning as an Anglo-Saxon siege of a hilltop (here initially desperately defended by Guinevere, who is depicted as a brilliant strategist and rallying figure) and having Arthur's cavalry appear with the sign of the cross on their shields (here a requisite demanded by the Christian king Tewdric for him to also join the battle), to create a more grounded and realistic depiction than the ones from his medieval sources. The 2004 film King Arthur ends in a climactic battle scene occurring along the Hadrian Wall as the mostly Romano-British forces of Arthur defeat those of the Saxon kings Cerdic and Cynric, at a heavy cost to Arthur.

See also
Battle of Camlann (Salisbury), King Arthur's final fight in his legend

Notes

References

Sources
Green, Thomas. Concepts of Arthur. Tempus (Stroud, Gloucestershire), 2007. .

Badon
5th century in England
5th century in Wales
Badon
6th century in England
6th century in Wales
Badon
Badon
Badon
Geoffrey of Monmouth